"Snuffy's Parents Get a Divorce" is the name of an episode on the children's television program Sesame Street. Produced in 1992, it never aired because tests showed several unintended negative effects. Sesame Street has had a history of presenting difficult topics as part of its affective curriculum goals, including death, marriage, childbirth, and disaster. Extensive research was done before these episodes were written and produced, to ascertain their focus, and after they aired, to analyze the effect they had on viewers, and that was the case for "Snuffy's Parents Get a Divorce". The show's producers had expressed a desire to produce the episode as early as 1989, and they were convinced that it was a topic they should address after the US Census Bureau reported that 40% of American children had experienced divorce.

The producers chose to present the Muppet Mr. Snuffleupagus ("Snuffy") and his family's experience of divorce. The episode was written by staff writer Norman Stiles, who also wrote the 1983 episode in which Mr. Hooper's death was explained. Every word of the divorce episode was reviewed by the Children's Television Workshop's (CTW) advisory board, content experts, and developmental psychologists. After tests showed that their young viewers were confused by the episode and did not understand important concepts about divorce, the producers decided not to air it, despite the investment they had made. This marks the only time the show's producers made this kind of decision, and was cited as an example of the producer's practice of "listening to the voices of children and by putting their needs first", despite the costs.

Sesame Street did not address the topic of divorce until November 2012, when they produced a video for limited audiences titled Little Children, Big Challenges: Divorce as part of their resiliency initiative.

Background 
Sesame Street, which premiered in 1969, was the first children's television program to use a detailed and comprehensive educational curriculum, with specific educational goals, in its content. The show's goals included both cognitive and affective objectives. Initially, the cognitive skills of its young viewers were stressed over affective skills, which were addressed indirectly because the producers, writers, and researchers believed that focusing on cognitive skills would increase children's self-esteem and feelings of competency. Eventually, after the show's first season, its critics forced its staff to address affective goals more overtly, which occurred after "extensive research and planning".

According to writer Michael Davis, Sesame Street's curriculum began addressing affective goals more overtly during the 1980s. For example, the producers addressed grief after the 1982 death of Will Lee, who had played Mr. Hooper since the show's premiere. Author David Borgenicht called the episode "poignant", and Davis called it "a landmark broadcast" and "a truly memorable episode, one of the show's best". For the 1988 and 1989 seasons, the topics of love, marriage, and childbirth were addressed when the show's staff created a storyline in which the characters Luis and Maria fall in love, marry, and have a child, Gabi. Extensive research was done before these episodes were written and produced, to ascertain their focus, and after they aired, to analyze the effect they had on viewers. The show also addressed real-life disasters. For example, the producers addressed the September 11 terrorist attacks with an episode that aired in early 2002. They also produced a series of four episodes that aired after Hurricane Katrina in 2005.

Development 
The Children's Television Workshop (CTW, later Sesame Workshop), the organization responsible for the production of Sesame Street, considered and discussed addressing the topic of divorce for many years before developing an episode. As early as 1989, writer and director Jon Stone expressed his intention of writing a script about it, stating, "My two projects for this year are drugs and divorce. Divorce is a difficult one. Perhaps we could do it with puppets. I am also writing a script on drugs and peer pressure". Executive producer Dulcy Singer vetoed the idea in 1990, before it reached development. While she felt complex social matters should be discussed on the series, she felt the issue was irrelevant to inner city and financially disadvantaged families, which was the show's target audience. She said that "divorce is a middle-class thing," and suggested instead that an episode focus on a single-parent family, with the child born out of wedlock with an absent father. Singer stated, even after the episode was filmed, "We were really nervous about the show, and we didn't think it was a shoo-in. When you're dealing with something like death, the approach can be universal. But with divorce, it's so personal. People react differently."  The topic of divorce was discussed again the following year, after the US Census Bureau released statistics suggesting 40 percent of all children in the United States, not just the middle classes, would soon live in divorced households.

Producer/director Lisa Simon stated, regarding the difficulty the producers and writers had with crafting the episode, "We hope to get to it by the end of the season. It always takes us a while to figure out how to do an issue appropriately, from a child's point of view". Puppeteer Jerry Nelson, who was one of the original performers of Snuffy, noted, "Now we delve into things like divorce that are likely to affect small children very heavily. We didn't touch those things before".

Instead of using the human characters in the show's cast, the writers and producers decided to use Muppets to present their narrative about the effects of divorce on young children. They chose to use the family of Mr. Snuffleupagus ("Snuffy"), a large Muppet that had been on the show since 1971. Long-time cast member Bob McGrath stated, "They knew they couldn't do it with either of our married couples—Gordon and Susan or Maria and Luis—so they tried it with Snuffleupagus, writing a show about his parents getting divorced". According to Simon, "With puppets, it's slightly less frightening ... The kids have somebody to identify with. They see the puppet characters have feelings and work through a difficult issue many of them will have to face".

Staff writer Norman Stiles, who also wrote the episode in which Mr. Hooper's death was explained, was assigned to compose the script. Every word of the divorce episode was reviewed by CTW's advisory board, content experts, and developmental psychologists. The episode featured Gordon explaining the concept of divorce, Snuffy being assured that his parents still loved him, and the characters talking and singing "about how Snuffy will have good homes, and so on and so on".

Test results 
As with the Mr. Hooper episode, "Snuffy's Parents Get a Divorce" was studied extensively for comprehension and attention. After it was filmed, it was screened before a test audience of 60 children in four daycare centers. The results found several unintended negative effects. As The Christian Science Monitor said, "it bombed". Despite Gordon's reassuring the Muppets Elmo, Big Bird, and Telly, children believed that their parents' arguments would lead to their divorce. They also were unsure that Snuffy and his little sister Alice's parents loved them despite the divorce, and were unclear where the characters' parents lived (especially their father, who had never appeared on the show before). Many viewers also thought that Snuffy and Alice would never see their father again. According to Singer, "The kids came away with negative messages ... The kids misunderstood arguments. They said arguments did mean divorce. Some thought Snuffy's parents were moving away even though we said just the opposite. A number said the parents would no longer be in love with them".

Based upon their findings, and despite the expense and their intention to air "Snuffy's Parents Get a Divorce" in April 1992, the CTW decided not to risk possibly harming their audience and not air the episode. McGrath said, "They wrote a whole show and taped it, and it was just devastating for test groups of kids. So they just threw the whole thing in the garbage and never tried it again. It was just too difficult a concept for a 3-year-old". CTW Research director Valeria Lovelace recommended scrapping the episode and going "back to the drawing board", and the idea was abandoned, at least for the season. Producer Michael Loman recalled, "We ate the cost and never aired it. We feel there are a range of issues that we can deal with in the family that do not go to the extreme of divorce". According to Sesame Street researcher Susan Scheiner, it was the first time the CTW had produced an episode, and after making a large investment, found after tests that the episode did not work. Rosemarie T. Truglio and her colleagues at the CTW cited the episode as an example of the CTW's practice of "listening to the voices of children and by putting their needs first".

Legacy 
Sesame Street did not address the subject of divorce until November 2012, when its producers created, as part of their resiliency initiative, Little Children, Big Challenges: Divorce. It was made available to military families and to the general public through family courts, counseling services, and parenting and child care programs. It included a 22-minute DVD, a caregiver guide, a storybook, a tip sheet for extended families and friends, mobile apps and social networking sites, and an online toolkit. Like in "Snuffy's Parents Get a Divorce", the Little Children, Big Challenges production also used a Muppet, Abby Cadabby, to represent the child experiencing divorce. Whereas Snuffy was shown going through it in real time, Abby's parents' divorce was in the past, which gave her time to adjust.

Footage from the episode exists at the Museum of the Moving Image near the studios where Sesame Street is filmed, and was screened for the public in November 2019. Some footage of the episode was aired during the Sesame Street: 50 Years of Sunny Days documentary on ABC.

References

Works cited 
 Borgenicht, David (1998). Sesame Street Unpaved. New York: Hyperion Publishing. 
 Davis, Michael (2008). Street Gang: The Complete History of Sesame Street. New York: Viking Penguin. 
 Gikow, Louise A. (2009). Sesame Street: A Celebration— Forty Years of Life on the Street. New York: Black Dog & Leventhal Publishers. .
 Morrow, Robert W. (2006). Sesame Street and the Reform of Children's Television. Baltimore, Maryland: Johns Hopkins University Press. 
 Truglio, Rosemary T.; Valeria O. Lovelace; Ivelisse Sequi; Susan Scheiner (2001). "The Varied Role of Formative Research: Case Studies from 30 Years". In Fisch, Shalom M. and Rosemarie T. Truglio, Eds. "G" is for Growing: Thirty Years of Research on Children and Sesame Street. Mahweh, New Jersey: Lawrence Erlbaum Publishers. pp. 61–82.

External links 
 Sesame Workshop
 Little Children, Big Challenges: Divorce resource site

Sesame Street
Unaired television episodes
Television episodes about divorce